The Super League Super 8s are the second stage of the Super League season as part of the Super 8s. Super League is officially known as Super League Europe and it is the top-level of the British rugby league system.

Format
After 23 rounds in the regular season, the top 8 clubs carry points they have earned forward and play each other once more home or away depending on league positioning. After 7 more games the top four teams enter the playoffs.

Results

Super 8 Appearances

Bold- Won the Grand Final

Italic- Won League Leaders Shield

Bold & Italic - Won Grand Final & League Leaders Shield

Super League
Rugby league competitions in the United Kingdom
Professional sports leagues in the United Kingdom
European rugby league competitions